Paul du Châtellier (13 November 1833 - March 1911) was a French prehistorian.

In 1900, he discovered the Saint-Bélec slab, which is believed to be one of the world's oldest maps.

References

19th-century French historians
1833 births
1911 deaths